Seneviratne or Senewiratne  is a Sinhalese surname. Notable people with the surname include:

 Ana Seneviratne (1927–2015), Sri Lankan police officer
 Athauda Seneviratne, Sri Lankan politician
 Chamani Seneviratne (born 1978), Sri Lankan cricketer
 Hector Vernon Ivan Seneviratne Corea, Sri Lankan Anglican priest
 Jayantha Seneviratne, Sri Lankan cricketer
 John Seneviratne (born 1941), Sri Lankan politician
 K. N. Seneviratne (1929–1986), Sri Lankan physician and academic
 Lakshman Senewiratne (born 1957), Sri Lankan politician
 Malinda Seneviratne (born 1965), Sri Lankan journalist
 Nalin Seneviratne (1931–2009), Sri Lankan army officer
 Nihal Seneviratne, Sri Lankan civil servant
 Ran Banda Seneviratne (died 2001), Sri Lankan lawyer and broadcaster
 Sonia I. Seneviratne, Swiss geophysicist
 W. I. M. Seneviratne (died 1996), Sri Lankan soldier

See also
 
 

Sinhalese surnames